In the Grayscale is a Chilean drama film, released in 2015.

The film stars Francisco Celhay as Bruno, an architect separated from his wife Soledad (Daniela Ramírez), who begins to explore his unresolved bisexuality when a new project to design a public monument in Santiago brings him into contact with Fer (Emilio Edwards), an out gay travel guide to whom he feels a strong attraction.

The film, the directorial debut of Claudio Marcone, won the Ibero-American Opera Prima Award at the Miami International Film Festival, and it was named Best First Feature at the Frameline Film Festival.

Plot
Bruno (Celhay) is a 35-year-old architect who leads a seemingly perfect life. He resides in a beautiful house with his wife and child and also owns a thriving architecture office. However, despite his comfortable lifestyle, he experiences a profound sense of unease. As a result, he decides to leave everything behind and move out to live alone, coincidentally when a businessman approaches him to design an icon for the city of Santiago. With newfound motivation, he embarks on a quest to search for heritage traces, accompanied by Fer (Emilio Edwards), a 29-year-old, energetic, and captivating gay history professor.

See also
List of lesbian, gay, bisexual or transgender-related films of 2015

References

External links
 

2015 films
2015 LGBT-related films
LGBT-related drama films
Chilean drama films
Chilean LGBT-related films
Male bisexuality in film
2015 directorial debut films
Gay-related films
2015 drama films
2010s Spanish-language films